Claude Bertrand (24 March 1919 – 14 December 1986) was a French film, television and voiceover actor.

In a career that has spanned four decades, Bertrand was best known in French film and television as a voice over actor. He was the French dub for Roger Moore, Charles Bronson, John Wayne, Bud Spencer and Burt Lancaster. He also shared his voice in animation, he provided the voice of Baloo in the French version of The Jungle Book, O'Malley in The Aristocats and Little John in Robin Hood. He also voiced Captain Haddock in Tintin and the Temple of the Sun and Tintin and the Lake of Sharks.

He also dubbed Roger Moore into French in the James Bond series between 1973 and 1985.

Bertrand died in 1986 after suffering from cancer.

Filmography

Film
 L'échafaud peut attendre (1949)
 Le Secret de Mayerling (1949) - (uncredited)
 Les mousquetaires du roi (1951)
 Spartaco (1951) - (french version, voice)
 The Love of a Woman (1953) - André Lorenzi (voice, uncredited)
 Le Couteau sous la gorge (1955) - Machecoul
 Marguerite de la nuit (1955) - Roger (uncredited)
 Dynamite Jack (1961) - Dynamite Jack (voice, uncredited)
 Paris brûle-t-il? (1966)
 Martin soldat (1966) - Galland
 Caroline chérie (1968) - Le municipal de la prison (uncredited)
 Le gendarme se marie (1968) - Poussin Bleu
 Tintin and the Temple of the Sun (1969) - Le capitaine Haddock (voice)
 And Soon the Darkness (1970) - Lassal
 L'Amour l'après-midi (1972) - The Male Student
 Tintin and the Lake of Sharks (1972) - Capitaine Haddock (voice)
 The Three Musketeers (1973) - Porthos (voice)
 Tarzoon: Shame of the Jungle (1975) - Le chef M'Bulu (French version, voice)
 The Twelve Tasks of Asterix (1976) - Un sénateur et le centurion (voice)
 Police Python 357 (1976) - Le marchand de cochons
 Sexuella (1976)
 Une robe noire pour un tueur (1981)
 Le Maître d'école (1981) - Le père de Charlotte

Animation
 Tintin and the Temple of the Sun (1969)
 Tintin and the Lake of Sharks (1972)
 Tarzoon: Shame of the Jungle (1975)
 The Twelve Tasks of Asterix (1976)
 The Jungle Book (1967) French voice of Baloo
 The Aristocats (1970) French voice of Thomas O'Malley 
 Robin Hood (1973) French voice of Little John

References

External links
 

1919 births
1986 deaths
People from Bouches-du-Rhône
Deaths from cancer in France
French male film actors
French male television actors
French male voice actors
20th-century French male actors